Hannu Antero Lahtinen (20 September 1960 – 20 November 2020) was a Finnish Greco-Roman style wrestler and a world champion, who competed in the 1984 Summer Olympics. Lahtinen was born in Jalasjärvi, and died in 2020 from amyotrophic lateral sclerosis.

References

External links
 

1960 births
2020 deaths
Olympic wrestlers of Finland
Wrestlers at the 1984 Summer Olympics
Finnish male sport wrestlers
Neurological disease deaths in Finland
Deaths from motor neuron disease
People from Jalasjärvi
Sportspeople from South Ostrobothnia
World Wrestling Championships medalists